Taldon Manton (August 24, 1910 – February 15, 1991) was an American football fullback in the National Football League for the New York Giants, the Washington Redskins, and the Brooklyn Dodgers.  He attended Louisiana State University and Texas Christian University.

External links 
 

1910 births
1991 deaths
People from Ryan, Oklahoma
American football fullbacks
LSU Tigers football players
TCU Horned Frogs football players
New York Giants players
Washington Redskins players
Brooklyn Dodgers (NFL) players
Players of American football from Oklahoma